Hesperoperla pacifica, the golden stonefly, is a species of common stonefly in the family Perlidae. It is found in North America. Its nymph is distinguished from other perlids by a pale, hourglass-shaped mark on its head.

References

Perlidae
Articles created by Qbugbot
Insects described in 1900